Pierpaolo Frattini (born 23 February 1984) is an Italian rower. He competed in the men's eight event at the 2016 Summer Olympics.

References

External links
 

1984 births
Living people
Italian male rowers
Olympic rowers of Italy
Rowers at the 2004 Summer Olympics
Rowers at the 2012 Summer Olympics
Rowers at the 2016 Summer Olympics
Place of birth missing (living people)
World Rowing Championships medalists for Italy